Huacracocha (possibly from Quechua waqra horn, qucha lake, lagoon, "horn lake") is a lake in Peru located in the Junín Region, Yauli Province, Morococha District. It lies southeast of the mountain Anticona and south of the mountain Yanashinga, near the Ticlio (Anticona) mountain pass.

See also
 Tiktiqucha
 Tukumach'ay

References

Lakes of Peru
Lakes of Junín Region